This list includes ballparks that may have been used as settings in filmmaking and television productions. Footage of actual sports events is most likely not included unless it was potentially used as stock footage or otherwise woven into a fictional storyline of a film or TV show. References are typically within the individual articles. This is not necessarily an exhaustive list.

Anaheim Stadium, Anaheim, California
Angels in the Outfield, 1994 film (exterior and sky shots)
Deuce Bigalow: Male Gigolo, 1999 film

Astrodome, Houston
Brewster McCloud, 1970 film (many scenes)
The Bad News Bears in Breaking Training, 1977 film (many scenes)
Murder at the World Series, 1977 made-for-TV film (several scenes)
Night Game, 1989 film (many scenes)

Atlanta–Fulton County Stadium, Atlanta
The Slugger's Wife, 1985 film (many scenes)

Bosse Field, Evansville, Indiana
A League of Their Own, 1992 (secondary setting, as home of the Racine Belles)

Bush Stadium, Indianapolis, Indiana
Eight Men Out, 1988 film (standing in for both Comiskey Park and Redland Field)

Candlestick Park, San Francisco, California
Experiment in Terror, 1962 film (closing scenes)
The Fan, 1996 film (many scenes)

Citi Field, Queens, New York
Sharknado 2: The Second One, 2014 film
Avengers: Endgame, 2019 film
Yesterday, 2019 film

Cleveland Stadium, Cleveland, Ohio
The Fortune Cookie, 1965 film - first of many films starring Jack Lemmon & Walter Matthau. Story about a CBS cameraman (Lemmon) knocked unconscious during a Cleveland Browns vs Minnesota Vikings game. His shyster lawyer brother-in-law (Matthau) sees opportunity for a windfall of money. Matthau won the Best Supporting Academy Award from this film. Directed by Billy Wilder.

Major League, 1989 film (primary setting, but only a few scenes were actually shot there)

College Park, Charleston, South Carolina
Major League: Back to the Minors, 1998 film (primary setting)

Comiskey Park, Chicago
The Pride of the Yankees, 1942 film (some scenes)
The Stratton Story, 1949 film (many scenes)
Only the Lonely, 1991 film (one scene)

Dodger Stadium, Los Angeles, California

Mr. Ed episode, "Leo Durocher Meets Mr. Ed", first aired Sep 29, 1963 
Hickey & Boggs, 1972 film (a few scenes)
Better Off Dead, 1985 film (closing scenes)
52 Pick-Up, 1986 film (one scene set during Dodgers-Mets game on May 16, 1986)
The Naked Gun: From the Files of Police Squad!, 1988 film (closing scenes)
The Sandlot, 1993 film (cameo)
The Fast and the Furious, 2001 film (opening scene driving in the parking lot)
Clubhouse, 2004 TV series (standing in for a fictional New York stadium)
Superman Returns 2006 film (one scene, with CGI alterations)
Transformers, 2007 film (one scene)

Dolphin Stadium, Miami, Florida

’’Marley & Me 2008 film , (One Scene)
 
Doubleday Field, Cooperstown, New York
A League of Their Own, 1992 film (closing scenes)

Durham Athletic Park, Durham, North Carolina
Bull Durham, 1988 film (many scenes)

Ebbets Field, Brooklyn, New York
Roogie's Bump , 

Ernie Shore Field, Winston-Salem, North Carolina
Mr. Destiny, 1990 (several scenes)

Fenway Park, Boston, Massachusetts
Field of Dreams, 1989 film (cameo)
Fever Pitch, 2005 film
The Town, 2010 film (lengthy scene depicting a robbery)
Moneyball (film), 2011 film (one scene)
Ted (film), 2012 film (one scene)
Patriots Day (film), 2016 film (one scene)

Forbes Field, Pittsburgh, Pennsylvania
Angels in the Outfield, 1951 film

Gilmore Field, Los Angeles, California
The Stratton Story, 1949 film

Grayson Stadium, Savannah, Georgia
The Bingo Long Traveling All-Stars & Motor Kings, 1976 film (some scenes)

Griffith Stadium, Washington, D.C.
Damn Yankees, 1958 film (crowd scenes)

John O'Donnell Stadium, Davenport, Iowa
Sugar, 2008 film (many scenes)

League Stadium, Huntingburg, Indiana
A League of Their Own, 1992 (primary setting, as home of the Rockford Peaches)
Soul of the Game, 1996 film (primary baseball setting)

Luther Williams Field, Macon, Georgia
The Bingo Long Traveling All-Stars & Motor Kings, 1976 film (many scenes)

Memorial Stadium, Baltimore, Maryland
Tin Men, 1987 film (exteriors, background)
Homicide: Life on the Street, 1993–99 TV series (occasional scenes)
Major League II, 1994 film (some scenes)

Metrodome, Minneapolis, Minnesota
Little Big League, 1994 film (primary setting)
Major League: Back to the Minors, 1998 film (secondary setting)

Miller Park, Milwaukee, Wisconsin
Mr. 3000, 2004 film (several scenes)

Milwaukee County Stadium, Milwaukee, Wisconsin
Major League, 1989 film (standing in for the primary setting of Cleveland Stadium)

Minute Maid Park, Houston, Texas
Boyhood, 2014 film (one scene)

Nationals Park, Washington, District of Columbia
How Do You Know, 2010 film (one scene)

Oakland–Alameda County Coliseum, Oakland, California
Angels in the Outfield, 1994 film (primary setting)
Moneyball (film), 2011 film (primary scene)

Oriole Park at Camden Yards, Baltimore, Maryland
Dave, 1993 film (cameo)
Homicide: Life on the Street, 1993–99 TV series (occasional scenes)
Major League II, 1994 film (primary setting)

PNC Park, Pittsburgh, Pennsylvania
Chasing 3000, 2008 film
Abduction, 2011 film

Rangers Ballpark in Arlington, Arlington, Texas
The Rookie, 2002 film (primary setting)

Safeco Field, Seattle
Life, or Something Like It, 2002 film (some scenes)

Shea Stadium, Queens, New York
The Odd Couple, 1968 (cameo)
Bang the Drum Slowly, 1973 film (many scenes)
The Wiz, 1978 film (flying monkeys chase)
Seven Minutes in Heaven (film), 1985 film (one scene)
Seinfeld, TV series, 1992 episode "The Boyfriend" (cameo)
Men in Black, 1997 film (one scene)
Two Weeks Notice, 2002 film (one scene)

Sportsman's Park, St. Louis, Missouri
The Pride of St. Louis, 1952 film
The Winning Team, another 1952 film
The Pride of the Yankees, 1942 film (cameo)

Tiger Stadium, Detroit, Michigan
The Pride of the Yankees, 1942 film (some scenes)
One in a Million: The Ron LeFlore Story, 1978, made-for-TV film (many scenes)
Tiger Town, 1983, made-for-TV film (many scenes)
61*, 2001, made-for-TV film (primary setting and Tiger Stadium)
Hardball, 2001, (one scene as 'Chicago Field')
Hung, 2009, pilot episode of HBO TV show
Kill the Irishman, 2011

Turner Field, Atlanta, Georgia
The Change-Up, 2011 film
Trouble with the Curve, 2012 film
Flight, 2012 film

U. S. Cellular Field, Chicago
Rookie of the Year, 1993 film (some scenes)
Little Big League, 1994 film (all games played by the featured Minnesota Twins on the road)
Major League II, 1994 film (some scenes)
My Best Friend's Wedding, 1997 film (cameo)

War Memorial Stadium, Buffalo, New York
The Natural, 1984 film

Wrigley Field, Chicago
Wrigley scenes in 1984 film The Natural were actually filmed at All-High Stadium in Buffalo, New York
The Blues Brothers, 1980 film (cameo)
Ferris Bueller's Day Off, 1986 film (one scene)
About Last Night..., 1986 film (one scene)
The Naked Gun: From the Files of Police Squad!, 1988 film (cameo)
A League of Their Own, 1992 film (early scenes, as fictional Harvey Field)
Rookie of the Year, 1993 film (primary setting)
I Want Someone to Eat Cheese With, 2006 film
Wrigley Field, Los Angeles, California
The Stratton Story, 1949 film (a few scenes)
Armored Car Robbery, 1950 film (one scene)
Angels in the Outfield, 1951 film (a few scenes)
The Kid from Left Field, 1953 film (many scenes)
Damn Yankees, 1958 film (primary setting – standing in for Griffith Stadium)
The Geisha Boy, 1958 film 
Home Run Derby, 1959 TV series
The Twilight Zone, 1960 episode "The Mighty Casey"

Yankee Stadium I, Bronx, New York
The Pride of the Yankees, 1942 film (many scenes)
Woman of the Year, 1942 film (one scene)
Angels in the Outfield, 1951 film (setting for cameo by Joe DiMaggio)
The FBI Story, 1959 film (Interior and exterior shots seen while FBI agents are keeping communist suspect under surveillance.)
West Side Story, 1961 film (cameo – overhead shot during opening credits)
Bang the Drum Slowly, 1973 film (several scenes standing in for Shea Stadium)
Variety, 1983 film (one scene set at Yankees-Red Sox game on October 1, 1982)
Seinfeld, TV series, cameos in various episodes 1994–98 starting with "The Opposite" (George Costanza's workplace)
For Love of the Game, 1999 film (many scenes)
Anger Management, 2003 film (closing scene)

Yankee Stadium II, Bronx, New York
The Adjustment Bureau, 2011 film (one scene)

Zephyr Field, Metairie, Louisiana
Mr. 3000, 2004 film (several scenes)

See also
Lists of baseball parks

References

Film and television
Baseball parks